Irina Chakraborty is a Russian-Finnish-Indian scientist, an environmental engineer and a university instructor. She has lived in Phnom Penh, Cambodia since 2011. She was selected as one of BBC'S 100 Women in 2013 for her work with sanitation for floating villages.

References 

Year of birth missing (living people)
Living people
BBC 100 Women
Russian environmentalists
Russian women scientists
Environmental engineers